The British Democratic Party (BDP), commonly known as the British Democrats, is a British far-right political party. It was registered with the Electoral Commission in 2011, and officially launched in 2013 at a Leicestershire village hall by a ten-member steering committee which included former members of several political parties including the British National Party (BNP), Democratic Nationalists, Freedom Party and UK Independence Party (UKIP). It currently has four parish councillors and one local councillor, making it the largest far-right party in the UK in terms of electoral representation

The party's inaugural president was Andrew Brons, then a Member of the European Parliament (MEP). Brons had been a member of the BNP and a leading member of the National Front (NF). The steering committee included a number of others with a history of membership in fascist and neo-Nazi groups, who believed that the BNP had been corrupted and watered-down.

History
Brons resigned from the BNP in October 2012, after narrowly failing in his campaign to unseat Nick Griffin as leader of the party in 2011. A number of other disillusioned BNP members have joined him, including Kevin Scott, founder and director of Civil Liberty and former party organiser for the British National Party in the North East. Other notable members of the party include:
 Adrian Davies, a longstanding critic of Griffin and a former Conservative member and former Freedom Party chairman, who wrote the party's constitution and registered the party name,
 John Bean, the former editor of the British National Party magazine Identity,
 James Lewthwaite, the BDP party chairman and a former Bradford councillor, who along with others established the Democratic Nationalists in 2010 and who stood for the Democratic Nationalists,
 Andrew Moffat, a former UKIP and BNP parliamentary candidate who worked with Andrew Brons in the European Parliament,
 Sam Swerling, a former Westminster City Councillor for the Conservative Party,
 Brian Parker, longest-serving far-right local councillor in British history and the last elected representative of the BNP,
 Adrian Romilly, former South West England regional chairman of the British National Party, and candidate in the 2009 Plymouth city council by-election and 2014 European Parliament election,
 David Furness, the former press officer, national spokesman and London mayoral candidate of the BNP. He joined the British Democrats following his defeat to Adam Walker in the 2019 BNP leadership election,
 Derek Beackon, a former National Front member and the first ever electoral success of the BNP, serving as a councillor of Millwall ward in Tower Hamlets Borough after winning a 1993 by-election,
 Bob Bailey, former leader of the opposition in the Barking & Dagenham Council, representing the British National Party, and
 Rod Law, a former Epping Forest District Councillor and BNP member.

Andrew Brons has also been the National Nominating Officer of the British Democratic Party since its foundation on 9 February 2013, with James Lewthwaite as the Leader and Chairman, and Christopher Canham as the Treasurer and Membership Secretary.

In 2013, Nick Lowles, of Hope not Hate, believed the party would be a serious threat to the BNP, commenting "The BDP brings together all of the hardcore Holocaust deniers and racists that have walked away from the BNP over the last two to three years, plus those previously, who could not stomach the party’s image changes.... They and the BNP already have a mutual hatred of each other and neither party will stop until they’ve killed the other one off. The gloves will be off and it will be toxic".

Following the dissolution of the For Britain Movement and the prolonged inactivity of the British National Party, a multitude of nationalist local councillors and prominent far-right activists have subsequently begun coalescing around the British Democrats.

In September 2022, BDP's chairman, James Lewthwaite, shared a platform at a far-right meeting in Preston, Lancashire, with Stephen Frost, the leader of the Neo-Nazi British Movement (BM).

Policies 
According to the party's website, the British Democrats support holding a referendum on the reintroduction of the death penalty and the creation of a devolved English parliament. They are unionist, and oppose a Second Scottish independence referendum or the inclusion of former Irish Republican Army members in Northern Irish legislatures. The party is critical of foreign aid and intervention, instead proposing that British troops are diverted to the country's borders to prevent illegal immigration.

The BDP frequently voices support for "ending all immigration" through mandatory repatriation of foreign criminals and incentivised repatriation of unassimilated immigrants, as well as by withdrawing from the 1951 Refugee Convention, European Convention on Human Rights (ECHR) and the Global Compact for Migration. The party also opposes laws that they perceive as mandating preferential treatment for immigrants and ethnic minorities, including hate speech laws.

The British Democrats claim that their protectionist policy of "economic nationalism" will prioritise local British workers and increase sufficiency. They are critical of globalisation, the employment of foreign doctors in the NHS, and of providing care for "health tourists". The party campaigned for the UK's withdrawal from the European Union, citing the cost and perceived lack of democracy within EU institutions.

The British Democratic Party's official platform proposes that students in state schools should be taught from a "non-denominational Christian perspective" and it opposes Drag Queen Story Hours or youth gender reassignment. The party has denounced ideologies such as political correctness, islamisation and communism, and their environmental policy is mostly concerned with issues like urban sprawl, but does not mention climate change. The BDP's attitude towards social issues has a generally Christian conservative perspective.

Electoral performance
The party fielded three candidates in the 2013 English County Council elections: two in north Leicestershire and one in Pendle, Lancashire. In Leicestershire, the party polled 215 votes (7.4%) in Coalville and 206 votes (7.4%) in Loughborough South, while in Lancashire it polled 133 (4.0%).

In a by-election for the Loughborough Hastings ward of Charnwood Borough Council on 24 October 2013, the British Democrats polled 85 votes (9.4%).

The party did not contest the May 2014 European Parliament election, but stood candidates in the local elections: two in Bradford, one in Leeds, three in Newcastle upon Tyne and one in the London Borough of Redbridge.

In a by-election for the Thurmaston Ward of Charnwood Borough Council on 31 July 2014, the British Democrats polled 94 votes (5.1%) beating the BNP into fifth place with 58 votes (3.2%).

In the 2015 United Kingdom general election, the party nominated one candidate, the BDP chairman, Jim Lewthwaite in Bradford East. He won 210 votes, 0.5% of the total cast.

In the 2019 local elections,  Lewthwaite, polled 701 votes (25%), coming second in Wyke Ward, Bradford.

In the 2022 local elections, Lewthwaite polled 214 votes (7.1%) in Wyke Ward, Bradford. Other BDP candidates included Christopher Bateman who polled 100 votes (4.6%) in Laindon Park, Basildon, Michael Jones who polled 253 votes (5.7%) in East Wickham ward, Bexley, and Lawrence Rustem (a former BNP parliamentary candidate) who polled 117 votes (13.7%) in Shepway South ward, Maidstone.

The party gained a parish councillor in March 2022, when John Robinson, who was elected to  Barnham and Eastergate Parish Council in West Sussex as an independent, joined the BDP. In July 2022, Julian Leppert, an elected councillor representing the For Britain Movement on Epping Forest District Council in Essex, joined the BDP. The party gained another parish councillor in August 2022, when Roger Robertson, an elected councillor in Hartley Wintney, Hampshire, joined the British Democrats. He like Leppert was also a former member of the For Britain Movement. Later that month, BDP candidate Lawrence Rustem was elected unopposed to Detling Parish Council in Kent, in what was the party's first ever election victory. In October 2022, the BDP candidate, Christopher Bateman, was elected to Noak Bridge Parish Council in Basildon, Essex, with 74% of the vote; he had previously represented the For Britain Movement in the Laindon Park council and is a former British National Party member.

At the British Democratic Party Annual General Meeting 2022, councillor Roger Robertson announced that he would stand for re-election as an independent candidate while still remaining a member of the BDP, and  Stephen Smith, a veteran British nationalist activist, laid out the party's plan to contest four to five seats in the next general election.

References

Further reading

Far-right political parties in the United Kingdom
Far-right politics in the United Kingdom
Political parties established in 2013
2013 establishments in the United Kingdom
2013 in British politics
Holocaust denial in the United Kingdom
Nationalist parties in the United Kingdom
Eurosceptic parties in the United Kingdom
Fascism in the United Kingdom
British National Party breakaway groups
Christian nationalism
Right-wing populism in the United Kingdom
Right-wing populist parties
National conservative parties
Organizations that oppose LGBT rights
Organisations that oppose LGBT rights in the United Kingdom
Anti-Islam sentiment in the United Kingdom
British nationalism
Anti-immigration politics in the United Kingdom
Anti-communist parties
Anti-communism in the United Kingdom
Anti-globalization political parties